The House of Zorzi or Giorgi was a noble family of Venetian origin. They thrived in the Late Middle Ages, especially in the remnants of the Latin Empire in Greece, where they controlled the Margraviate of Bodonitsa and through marriage the Duchy of Athens until the Ottoman conquest.

Doge Marino Zorzi had at least one brother. His name was Pietro Zorzi and his descendants changed their surname to Zazzera (sometimes deformed into Zazzara) and spread to various parts of Italy.

Under Nicholas I they took control of Bodonitsa in 1335. Nicholas was succeeded by Francis, who governed the margraviate for almost forty years. In 1414, Nicholas II was defeated and the Turks took control of Bodonitsa, nonetheless Nicholas III continued to employ the title and garner the prestige that came with it. He married his daughter Chiara to the duke of Athens, Nerio II. She was to govern the duchy on behalf of her young son Francesco I.

Gallery

See also
Marino Zorzi
Palazzo Correr Contarini Zorzi

References

Setton, Kenneth M. Catalan Domination of Athens 1311–1380. Revised edition. Variorum: London, 1975.